Bombshell is a sci-fi/thriller film written and directed by Paul Wynne, and starring Henry Thomas, Mädchen Amick, Frank Whaley, Pamela Gidley, and Brion James. It is produced by Wyatt Knight, Steven Paul, Patrick Peach, Vicky Pike, Jeff Ritchie, and Paul Wynne (himself). The production company is Molecular Films and Wynne/Pike Productions.

Plot
In the year 2011, a sophisticated Los Angeles Company, Nanolabs, prepares to advertise a cancer cure in the form of nano-engines, microscopic molecular machines which mutate and restore organic tissue cell by cell. Genius Buck Hogan (Henry Thomas) starts to have serious doubts when lab animals start to die. Profit-greedy CEO Donald (Brion James) ignores him and devises human tests and news conferences.

The same night, a strange-looking masked figure traps and anesthetizes Hogan. When Hogan awakens, he learns one of his kidneys has been expertly replaced with a biodegradable sac that according to later publications, holds corrosive acid. The masked man promises Hogan an antidote only if he complies in picking up and delivering three packages. When the departmental LAPD refuses to help, and Hogan's fiancee Angeline (Mädchen Amick) is abducted, Hogan rips open a package and discovers it is empty. Hogan realizes that the courier act was a ruse to cause him to touch boxes coated with nano-engines, which penetrate his skin and are reacting with the sac. Hogan traces the potential culprit, fellow employee and career rival Malcolm Garvey (Frank Whaley), who forces the couple into Nanolabs at gunpoint during Donald's big press tour.

Revealing that the cancer cure is actually a carcinogen, Garvey also tells that the nano-engines inside Hogan have converted his implant into a destructive bomb. In the following panic, Garvey is shot dead and Angeline and Hogan remain in the building. Fortunately, Angeline happens to be a surgeon and executes an effective bomb-ectomy on the spot. They flee as the lab explodes, but Garvey's caution is lost in the pointless electronic media.

Cast
 Henry Thomas as Buck Hogan
 Mädchen Amick as Angeline
 Frank Whaley as Malcolm Garvey
 Pamela Gidley as Melinda Clark
 Brion James as Donald
 Michael Jace as Detective Jefferson
 Martin Hewitt as Adam
 David Packer as Brad
 Shawnee Smith as Shelly
 Victoria Jackson as The Waitress
 David "Shark" Fralick as Buff
 Art Chudabala as Bewayne
 Carole White as Carol White
 James Dumont as Dr. Braunmann

Production
Filming was taken place in Los Angeles, California. It was produced by Molecular Films and Wynne/Pike Productions. It was distributed by Crystal Sky Worldwide, Spentzos Film Home Video, and Trimark Pictures.

Reception
Critical reception to the film has been negative. TV Guide wrote

Some praise went to the plot of the film "that the nano-engines ... assemble an explosive device inside Hogan's gut is a neat payoff; too bad Wynne couldn't think of a better way to get there (or escape from it)". However, criticism was directed to the running of the film: "The game is mostly up at the 70-minute mark, ... director Paul Wynne pads the remaining running time with a protracted car chase and ... fruitless attacks on shallow TV journalism."

Surprise praise was given to cinematographer Angel Colmenares ... BOMBSHELL is worth watching, if only for Angel Colmenares' snazzy cinematography, which paints the future-shock sets with electric colors and sometimes slips into time-lapse imagery."

References

American science fiction thriller films
Films set in 2011
Films set in the future
1990s science fiction thriller films
1990s English-language films
1990s American films